The London and South East Merit League is a rugby league competition founded in 1965. It is also known as the London League (LL), London, South and East Merit League, London Amateur Rugby League (LARL) and London Merit League (LML).

It is now one of four feeder leagues for the Rugby League Conference (RLC). There is also a London Junior League for youth teams.

Structure

The merit system, which gives its unofficial name to the league as the London Merit League, came about as a way to accommodate the needs of as many of clubs as possible. The "merit table" system gives teams, freedom to arrange as many or few games amongst the other league participants as they wish. The results of fixtures worked out between the teams are compiled into a league table based on average scores. The top six teams then go through to a play-off system to determine the champion club. The London League participants also have the opportunity to arrange games with clubs participating in the RL Merit League or Midlands Rugby League.

History

When the Acton & Willesden and Streatham & Mitcham clubs joined the Rugby Football League in 1935, a number of supporters and rejected trialists formed a number of amateur teams in London. There was no amateur competition in London at that time but leading clubs were Acton Hornets, Park Royal Rangers, Hendon, Dagenham, and Harlesden All Blacks. None of these clubs survived the failure of the two professional clubs.

Amateur clubs were again formed in Morden, Brixton, Mitcham, Slough and Southampton; and a four-team Southern Amateur Rugby League took place in 1949–50 before folding. There was an attempt to revive the league in 1955, when a Mr Tim Wood, of Chigwell Row, Essex, wrote to the Rugby Football League to enquire about possible assistance.

In 1965 Gordon Anderton placed an advert in the London Evening Standard saying that anyone interested in starting a rugby league side should meet at a Hackney pub and from this about half a dozen enthusiasts began to train in the National Sports Centre at Crystal Palace. Brian Blessed was the first coach, training moved to Hackney marshes and within twelve months the London Amateur Rugby League Association was formed, with Eddie Waring as its first president. It was soon renamed the Southern Amateur Rugby League as teams from outside London joined.

Hackney expanded and as many players came from the Ealing area a second club formed using the council pitch at Gunnersbury Park that was also used by a rugby union team. Ealing also grew quickly and with many new players coming from the Hillingdon area a third team soon followed.  In these early days 2nd Para Division at Aldershot also often fielded a team, when not on duty in Northern Ireland plus a team from Portsmouth University and then came Peckham who were based at Herne Hill Stadium. The stadium had been resurfaced to host the cycling world championships but unfortunately, a few months before the event the officials measured the track and found it was a metre short so no records would stand. The request to use the stadium for rugby league was an offer the council jumped at and as a result of playing at a relatively prestige stadium Peckham expanded and for many years was the premier team in the Southern League.

By 1981, there were enough teams competing to form a Second division and a Third division ran between 1984 and 1988. The league was rebranded the London Amateur Rugby League in 1986 to reflect the concentration of sides in the London area after outpost clubs Cheltenham, Aberavon, Hemel Hempstead, Milton Keynes and Wokingham (soon renamed Surrey Heath) all switched to the newly formed Midlands & South West League (MASWARLA) by its second season (Wokingham had been founder members). In 1995–96 there were two regionalised Second divisions due to the Eastern Counties League being absorbed into the London League and an influx of teams from South West England.

The Southern Conference League, founded in 1997, was the fore-runner of the Rugby League Conference. It included some of the top teams in the London Amateur Rugby League, focusing on clubs that either had or promised junior sections. As the best of the London League was gradually included into the Conference, the rest reformed as a summer merit league for new clubs, police / prison sides and second and third teams. The last winter season completed was 1998/99 and the first summer season was 2000.

The Gordon Anderton Memorial Trophy knock-out competition was established in 1997 and ran for two seasons. It was named after Gordon who ran the London League from 1965 to just before his death in the mid-90s.

The switched from the traditional winter season to a summer league in 2000 following the lead of the Super League which made the switch in 1996. The last winter London League season in 98/99 finished with only four teams still playing; London Colonials, South London Storm, London Skolars A and Metropolitan Police. The first London summer merit league started with eight teams.

From 2000 the London League Champions were determined via a play-off series culminating in a Grand Final. In 2011 the league was renamed London, South and East Merit League with teams joining from the East of England. In 2012 it became the London & South East Entrance League with the Eastern teams leaving to form the East Merit League.

Rugby League Conference Pyramid

 National Conference League
 Conference League South
 South Premier
 Eastern Men's League and London & South East Men's League
 London, South and East Merit League

The London League is the lowest level on the Rugby League Conference pyramid for clubs in the South of England.

Participating teams
In 2013 the following teams have entered:

Barking & Dagenham Bulldogs
Beckenham Bears
Greenwich Admirals
Guildford Giants
Hammersmith Hills Hoists A
Newham Dockers
Mudchute Uncles
Southend Spartans
South West London Chargers A
Staines Titans
St Albans Centurions A
Thames Ditton Tigers
Weald Warriors A

Participating teams by season

2000: Crawley Jets 'A', Huntingdon Town, Newmarket, North London Skolars 'A', Oxford Cavaliers 'A', St Albans Centurions 'A', South London Storm 'A', West London Sharks 'A'
2001: Crawley Jets 'A', Finchley, Luton Vipers, Newmarket, North London Skolars 'A', St Albans Centurions 'A', St Ives, South London Storm 'A', West London Sharks 'A'
2002: Crawley Jets 'A', Finchley, Greenwich Admirals, Luton Vipers 'A', North London Skolars 'A', St Albans Centurions 'A', St Ives, South London Storm 'A', South Norfolk Saints, West London Sharks 'A'
2003: Essex Eels 'A', Feltham YOI, Finchley, Greenwich Admirals 'A', Kingston Warriors 'A', Luton Vipers 'A', Metropolitan Police, Royal Military Academy Sandhurst, St Albans Centurions 'A', South London Storm 'B', West London Sharks 'A'
2004: 36th Engineering Regiment Maidstone, Bedford Tigers, Croydon Hurricanes, Dover Parachute Regiment, Feltham YOI, Greenwich Admirals 'A', Haringey Hornets, HMP The Mount, Ipswich Rhinos 'A', Kent Ravens, Kingston Warriors 'A', Luton Vipers 'A', Royal Military Academy Sandhurst, St Albans Centurions 'B', West London Sharks 'A'
2005: Broadstairs Bulldogs, Colchester Romans, Feltham YOI, Greenwich Admirals 'A', HMP The Mount, Ipswich Rhinos 'A', Kent Ravens, Metropolitan Police, West London Sharks 'A'
2006: Bedford Tigers 'A', Eastern Raiders, Feltham YOI, Kentish Tigers, Luton Vipers, Smallford Saints, South London Storm 'A', Southend Seaxes, West London Sharks 'A'
2007: Bedford Tigers 'A', Eastern Raiders, Farnborough Falcons, Feltham Eagles, Hadleigh Hawks, Hainault Bulldogs, Kent Ravens 'A', London Griffins, Metropolitan Police, Northampton Casuals, St Albans Centurions 'A', Smallford Saints, South London Storm 'A', Southampton Spitfires, Southgate Skolars, Southgate Skolars 'A', West London Sharks 'A'
2008: Bedford Tigers 'A', Eastern Raiders, Farnborough Falcons, Feltham Eagles, Hainault Bulldogs 'A', Hemel Stags 'A', Kent Ravens, London Griffins, Metropolitan Police, Norwich City Saxons, St Albans Centurions 'A', St Ives Roosters 'A', South London Storm 'A', Southampton Spitfires, Southgate Skolars, West London Sharks 'A'
2009: Bedford Tigers 'A', Greenwich Admirals 'A', Guildford Giants 'A', Hammersmith Hills Hoists, Hemel Stags 'A', St Albans Centurions 'A', St Mary's University, South London Storm 'A', Southgate Skolars, Sussex Merlins, West London Sharks 'A'
2010: Bedford Tigers 'A', Colchester Romans, Eastern Rhinos 'A', Feltham Eagles, Greenwich Admirals 'A', Hammersmith Hills Hoists 'A', Hemel Stags 'A', Metropolitan Police, Phantoms, West London Sharks 'A'
2011: Bedford Tigers 'A', Fenland Foxes, Greenwich Admirals 'A', Guildford Giants 'A', Hammersmith Hills Hoists 'A', Hemel Stags 'A', London Skolars 'A' (called up to Rugby League Conference mid-season), Mudchute Uncles, Phantoms RL, RAF Odiham, St Albans Centurions 'A', South London Storm 'A', Southampton Spitfires 'A', West Norfolk Wildcats
2012: Barking & Dagenham Bulldogs, Hammersmith Hills Hoists A, Mudchute Uncles, Newham Dockers, Weald Warriors, Weald Warriors 'A'
2013: Barking & Dagenham Bulldogs, Beckenham Bears, Greenwich Admirals, Guildford Giants 'A', Hammersmith Hills Hoists 'A', Mudchute Uncles, Newham Dockers, St Albans Centurions 'A', South West London Chargers 'A', Southend Spartans, Staines Titans, Thames Ditton Tigers, Weald Warriors 'A'
2014: Billericay Rangers, Eastern Rhinos 'A', Fleet Mustangs, Hammersmith Hills Hoists, London Skolars 'B', St Albans Centurions 'A', South West London Chargers 'B', Wests Warriors
2015: Croydon Hurricanes, Fleet Mustangs, Hemel Stags A, Invicta Panthers, Newham Dockers, Richmond Warriors, South West London Chargers A, The Bears A, Weald Warriors, Wests Warriors A

Teams joining the Rugby League Conference

Many of the foundation clubs of the Rugby League Conference (RLC) came from the London League and the league has continued to provide teams such as North London Skolars, Ipswich Rhinos, Cambridge Eagles, St Albans Centurions, South London Storm and Kingston Warriors.

Since adopting its current format the London League has provided fifteen teams to the RLC:-
2002 Luton Vipers
2003 Greenwich Admirals, London Skolars A, South London Storm A, South Norfolk Saints and St Ives Roosters
2004 St Albans Centurions A
2005 Haringey Hornets, Luton Vipers 'A' (who failed to complete the season) and Bedford Tigers
2006 Kent Ravens, Colchester Romans and Broadstairs Bulldogs
2008 Northampton Casuals and Hainault Bulldogs
2009 Hainault Bulldogs 'A' (failed to complete the season), Norwich City Saxons, Kent Ravens (again, failed to complete the season), Farnborough Falcons (failed to start the season) and Southampton Spitfires
2010 Hammersmith Hills Hoists, South London Storm A (again), St Albans Centurions A (again, failed to complete the season) and Sussex Merlins
2011 London Skolars A (called up to replace Hainault Bulldogs midseason)

NB: These are the years these clubs joined the RLC.

Winners

From 2000 the London League Champions were determined via a play-off series culminating in a Grand Final.

Second Division
1981/82 Peckham II
1982/83 Fulham Travellers
1983/84 Peckham II
1984/85 Fulham Travellers
1985/86 St Marys
1986/87 Fulham Amateurs
1987/88 St Marys
1988/89 Peckham II
1993/94 Brent Ealing II
1994/95 Brent Ealing II
1995/96 Basingstoke Beasts
1996/97 Bexleyheath
1997/98 Kingston

Third Division
1984/85 Peckham Pumas
1985/86 Bexleyheath
1986/87 Hornsey Lambs
1987/88 Fulham Amateurs

London League Bowl Winners
1984/85 Peckham 26 Bexleyheath 18
1985/86 West London Institute 30 Hornsey Lambs 5
1986/87 Hornsey Lambs 35 Hemel 0
1987/88 Surrey Heath 22 Ealing 10
1988/89 Peckham II 26 Streatham Celtic 12
1989/90 Ealing II 32 Essex Scimitars 10
1990/91 Peckham II 20 Met Police 10
1992/93 South London Warriors II 20 Cambridge 14
1993/94 Peckham 29 Met Police 10
1994/95 South London Warriors II 48 Cambridge Eagles 12
1995/96 Basingstoke Beasts 26 Brent Ealing II 14
1996/97 Reading Raiders
1997/98 St Albans Centurions 32 Hemel Stags 18

London League Cup
1969/70 Ealing 30 Hillingdon 5
1970/71 Ealing 18 Hillingdon 6
1971/72 Hillingdon 13 Portsmouth Poly 11
1972/73 Ealing 15 Hackney 7
1973/74 Ealing 17 Peckham 16
1974/75 Peckham 11 Hackney 7
1975/76 Peckham 27 Hornchurch 17
1976/77 Peckham 24 Ealing 12
1977/78 Peckham 19 Ealing 12
1978/79 Peckham 29–Ealing 0
1979/80 Peckham 27 Ealing 9
1980/81 Peckham 22 Ealing 15
1981/82 Ealing 28 Oxford University 14
1982/83 Peckham 18 London Colonials 13
1983/84 London Colonials 14 Ealing 4
1984/85 London Colonials 18 Peckham Pumas 10
1985/86 South London Warriors 72 St Marys 5
1986/87 South London Warriors 32 London Colonials 7
1987/88 London Colonials 28 St Marys 6
1988/89 South London Warriors 26 London Colonials 22
1989/90 South London Warriors 24 St Marys 6
1990/91 South London Warriors 14 London Colonials 10
1991/92 South London Warriors 20 Ealing 18
1992/93 St Marys 52 South London Warriors 38
1993/94 South London Warriors 30 Ealing 8
1994/95 South London Warriors 36 Brent Ealing 8
1995/96 Reading Raiders 32 Oxford University 18
1996/97 Reading Raiders 36 West London 8
1997/98 Reading Raiders 28 Met Police 18
1998/99 Reading Raiders 18 North London 10
2000    St Albans Centurions 'A' def South London Storm 'A'

Plate Winners

2004 Greenwich Admirals bt West London Sharks (title awarded to Greenwich by default)
2005 Kent Ravens 30 Feltham Eagles 18
2006 Feltham Eagles 50 Southend 18
2007 Feltham Eagles 72 Kent Ravens 'A' 10
2008 Metropolitan Police 24 Farnborough Falcons18

7s (Keith Macklin Trophy)

1970 Peckham ARLC
1971 Parachute Regiment
1972 ANZACs

7s (Ealing Plate)
1971 Portsmouth
1972 Peckham

Gordon Anderton memorial trophy
1997/98 Reading Raiders 28–24 South London Saints
1998/99 Reading Raiders 32–28 South London Saints

Southern Cup
1995 Hemel Stags def London Colonials

See also

 British rugby league system
 Rugby League Conference
 Midlands Rugby League
 RL Merit League

References

External links

Rugby League Conference
Rugby league in London